SS Richard Henry Lee was a Liberty ship built in the United States during World War II. She was named after Richard Henry Lee, an American statesman and Founding Father from Virginia best known for the June 1776 Lee Resolution, the motion in the Second Continental Congress calling for the colonies' independence from Great Britain leading to the United States Declaration of Independence, which he signed. He also served a one-year term as the President of the Continental Congress, was a signatory to the Articles of Confederation, and was a United States senator from Virginia, from 1789 to 1792, serving during part of that time as the second President pro tempore of the upper house.

Construction
Richard Henry Lee was laid down on 15 July 1941, under a Maritime Commission (MARCOM) contract, MCE hull 18, by the Bethlehem-Fairfield Shipyard, Baltimore, Maryland; and was launched on 6 December 1941.

History
The Richard Henry Lee was allocated to the Calmar Steamship Corporation, on 20 February 1942. On 6 July 1948, she was laid up in the National Defense Reserve Fleet, Beaumont, Texas. The vessel was later sold for scrapping on 20 July 1965, to Southern Scrap Material, for $45,179.79 and was removed from the fleet, 20 August in the same year.

References

Bibliography

 
 
 
 

 

Liberty ships
Ships built in Baltimore
1941 ships
Beaumont Reserve Fleet
Ships named for Founding Fathers of the United States